George J. Keiser (February 22, 1946 – December 22, 2021) was an American politician in the state of North Dakota. He was a member of the North Dakota House of Representatives, representing the 47th district. A Republican, he was first elected in 1992. Keiser attended the University of Utah and earned a Ph.D., later becoming a businessman. He also served in the United States Army. From 1988 to 1992 he was Commissioner of the City of Bismarck.

In August 2019, Keiser was diagnosed with amyotrophic lateral sclerosis. He died from the disease on December 22, 2021, at the age of 75. Robb Eckert was appointed to finish his term of his 47th district office of the North Dakota House of Representatives.

References

1946 births
2021 deaths
20th-century American politicians
21st-century American politicians
Deaths from motor neuron disease
Farmers from North Dakota
Republican Party members of the North Dakota House of Representatives
Military personnel from North Dakota
Politicians from Bismarck, North Dakota
University of Utah alumni